Deadly Election is a 2015 historical mystery crime novel by Lindsey Davis and the third book in the Flavia Albia Mysteries (Falco: The New Generation) series. Set in Ancient Rome, the novel stars Flavia Albia, the British-born adopted daughter of Marcus Didius Falco (the hero of the author's 20-volume Marcus Didius Falco Mysteries series, published from 1989 to 2010).  Albia, a widow, works as a "delatrix" (a detective or private informer) in ancient Rome, like Falco. In the UK, the book's cover carries the strapline: "A Flavia Alba Novel".

Connections to the Falco series
The fates of two recurring characters from the Falco series (Claudius Laeta and Nothokleptes) are revealed and discussed.
By the time Albia meets Laeta, he is a dying man and soon passes on.
Nothokleptes is revealed to have gone senile; his business is now managed by his son.

References

External links
Deadly Election on Lindsey Davis' website

Novels set in ancient Rome
British historical novels
Flavia Albia novels
Hodder & Stoughton books
2015 British novels
Novels set in the 1st century
Historical crime novels